Women's water polo at the 2019 Summer Universiade was held in Casoria and Naples (Italy) from 2 to 13 July 2019.
Hungary defeated Italy in the gold-medal final and won the title for the first time.

Squads

Results 
All times are local (UTC+01:00)

Preliminary round

Group A

Group B

Knock-out stage

Brackets
Main bracket

5th to 8th place bracket

Round of 16

Quarter-finals

Semifinals

5th to 8th place

Finals
9th/10th place match

7th/8th place match

5th/6th place match

Bronze medal match

Gold medal match

Final standing

Top scorers 
Overall standing

References

External links
Results.universiade2019napoli.it - Waterpolo

Women